Beaver Dam is an unincorporated community in Bowie County, in the U.S. state of Texas. According to the Handbook of Texas, the community had a population of 55 in 2000. It is located within the Texarkana metropolitan area.

History
Beaver Dam was named after a large beaver dam at a nearby creek. The predominantly black community did not have a post office, but it did have a business and 10 residents in 1933. It went up to 25 in the 1940s and 50s. By the 1980s, Beaver Dam had a church, cemetery, and scattered houses. In 2000, the population was 55. 

On April 2-3, 1982, an F3 tornado swept through the community, destroying five homes.

Geography

Education
Beaver Dam is served by the DeKalb Independent School District.

References

Unincorporated communities in Bowie County, Texas
Unincorporated communities in Texas